Eastwick College and the HoHoKus Schools consists of four schools located in the northern New Jersey area, owned and operated by Eastwick Education.

Locations 
 Eastwick College - Ramsey, NJ
 HoHoKus-Trades - Paterson, NJ
 Eastwick College - Hackensack, NJ
 Eastwick College - Nutley, NJ

Private universities and colleges in New Jersey
Universities and colleges in Bergen County, New Jersey
Educational institutions established in 1985
1985 establishments in New Jersey